Neelagiri Therku Thottam, commonly known as Neelagiri, is a panchayat town in the Thanjavur taluk of the Thanjavur district of the Indian state of Tamil Nadu. It is a part of the Thanjavur urban agglomeration.

Demographics
 India census, Neelagiri had a population of 11,046. Men constitute 50% of the population and women 50%. Neelagiri has an average literacy rate of 78%, higher than the national average of 59.5%: male literacy is 83%, and female literacy is 73%. In Neelagiri, 10% of the population is under 6 years of age.

References

Cities and towns in Thanjavur district

fr:Nîlgîri (Tamil Nadu)
ja:ニーラギリ県
sv:Nilgiribergen